Large volume volcanic eruptions in the Basin and Range Province include Basin and Range eruptions in Utah, California, Idaho, Colorado, New Mexico, Texas, Arizona, Nevada, Wyoming and Oregon, as well as those of the Long Valley Caldera geological province and the Yellowstone hotspot.

Volcanic fields
Some of the volcanic fields within the Basin and Range Province: Northwestern Nevada, the Modoc Plateau, Central Nevada, the Great Basin, Southwestern Nevada, the Mojave Desert, and the Long Valley Caldera region. Named ones include: Coso Volcanic Field, Mono Lake Volcanic Field, Marysvale Volcanic Field, San Juan volcanic field, Indian Peak, Central Colorado volcanic field, Jemez volcanic lineament, Mogollon-Datil volcanic field, Santa Rosa-Calico, and Boot Heel volcanic field.

Geological features
Many geological features in Western United States have a Northeastern orientation, the North American craton motion has the same orientation as well. For example: the Trans-Challis fault zone, Idaho; the Snake River in Oregon; the Garlock Fault, California; the Colorado River in Utah; the Colorado Mineral Belt; Crater Flat-Reveille Range-Lunar Crater lineament, the Northwestern Nevada volcanic field; the San Juan caldera cluster, Colorado; the Socorro-Magdalena caldera cluster, New Mexico; Jemez volcanic lineament (Raton hotspot trail); and the Yellowstone hotspot trail. But the Yellowstone hotspot trail was modified through faults and extension.

Geology
Prior to the Eocene Epoch (55.8 ± 0.2 to 33.9 ± 0.1 Ma) the convergence rate of the Farallon and North American Plates was fast and the angle of subduction was shallow. During the Eocene the Farallon Plate subduction-associated compressive forces of the Laramide orogeny ended, plate interactions changed from orthogonal compression to oblique strike-slip, and volcanism in the Basin and Range Province flared up. It is suggested that this plate continued to be underthrust until about 19 Ma, at which time it was completely consumed and volcanic activity ceased, in part. Olivine basalt from the oceanic ridge erupted around 17 Ma and extension began. The extension resulted in roughly north-south-trending faults, the Great Basin, the Walker trough, the Owens graben, and the Rio Grande rift, for instance.

List of large volume eruptions in the Basin and Range Province

The large volume eruptions in the Basin and Range Province include:
Long Valley Caldera; Mono County, California, USA; 758.9 ± 1.8 ka; VEI 7;  of Bishop Tuff.
Valles Caldera, New Mexico, USA; around 1.47 Ma (Lower Bandelier eruption, the Otawi).
Yellowstone hotspot (?), Lake Owyhee volcanic fields; 15.0 to 15.5 Ma.
Yellowstone hotspot (?), Northwest Nevada volcanic field, Virgin Valley, High Rock, Hog Ranch, and unnamed calderas; West of the Pine Forest Range, Nevada; 15.5 to 16.5 Ma; Tuffs: Idaho Canyon, Ashdown, Summit Lake, and Soldier Meadow.
 Columbia River Basalt Province: Yellowstone hotspot releases a huge pulse of volcanic activity, the first eruptions were near the Oregon-Idaho-Washington border. Columbia River and Steens flood basalts, Pueblo Mountains, Steens Mountain, Washington, Oregon, and Idaho; most vigorous eruptions were from 14 to 17 Ma.
 Columbia River flood basalts, 
Steens flood basalts, 
Mount Belknap Caldera, Marysvale Volcanic Field, southwestern Utah; 19 Ma;  of tephra (Joe Lott member).
Big John Caldera, Marysvale Volcanic Field, southwestern Utah; 22 Ma;  of Delano Peak Tuff member.
Monroe Peak Caldera, Marysvale Volcanic Field, southwestern Utah; 23 Ma;  of Osiris Tuff.
Lake City calderas ( wide), San Juan volcanic field, Colorado; 23.1 Ma;  of Sunshine Peak Tuff.
Turkey Creek Caldera ( wide), Chiricahua National Monument, Arizona;  25 Ma;  of Rhyolite Canyon Formation.
Lake City calderas ( wide), San Juan volcanic field, Colorado; 25.9 Ma;  of tephra.
Questa Caldera ( wide), Questa-Latir volcanic locus, Questa, New Mexico; 26 Ma,  of Amalia Tuff.
San Luis caldera complex ( wide), Wheeler Geologic Area, San Juan volcanic field, Colorado; 26.8 Ma,  of Nelson Mountain Tuff.
San Luis caldera complex ( wide), Wheeler Geologic Area, San Juan volcanic field, Colorado; 26.9 Ma,  of Cebola Creek Tuff.
San Luis caldera complex ( wide), Wheeler Geologic Area, San Juan volcanic field, Colorado; 27 Ma,  of Rat Creek Tuff.
Three Creeks Caldera ( wide), Marysvale Volcanic Field, Cove Fort-Sulphurdale area, southwestern Utah;  27 Ma;  of Three Creeks Tuff Member of the Bullion Canyon Volcanics.
Central San Juan Caldera (concealed), San Juan volcanic field, Colorado; 27.2 Ma,  of Blue Creek Tuff.
Bachelor Caldera, Wheeler Geologic Area, San Juan volcanic field, Colorado; 27.35 Ma;  of Carpenter Ridge Tuff.
Silverton Caldera ( wide), San Juan volcanic field, Colorado; 27.6 Ma,   of Crystal Lake Tuff.
Lost Lake Caldera ( wide), San Juan volcanic field, Colorado; 28.2 Ma,   of Blue Mesa Tuff.
Platoro calderas, San Juan volcanic field, Platoro, Conejos County, Colorado; 28.2 Ma;  of Chiquito Peak Tuff.
Central San Juan Caldera (concealed), San Juan volcanic field, Colorado; 28.3 Ma;  of Masonic Park Tuff.
Ute Creek Caldera, Central Colorado volcanic field, Colorado; 28.3 Ma;  of Ute Ridge Tuff.

List of Rupelian calderas
The Rupelian age/stage (Paleogene period/system, Oligocene epoch/series) spans the time between 33.9 ±0.1 Ma and 28.4 ±0.1 Ma (million years ago).
Bursum Caldera (size: 40 x 30 km), Mogollon-Datil volcanic field, New Mexico; 28.5 Ma ±0.5;  of Bloodgood Canyon Tuff.
Bursum Caldera (size: 40 x 30 km), Mogollon-Datil volcanic field, New Mexico; 28.5 Ma ±0.5;  of Apache Springs Tuff.
San Juan Caldera (size: 24 x 22 km), San Juan volcanic field, Colorado; 28.5 Ma;  of tephra.
Summitville Caldera (size: 12 x 8 km), San Juan volcanic field, Colorado; 28.5 Ma;  of Ojito Creek/ La Jadero Tuffs.
Mount Hope (size: 15 km), San Juan volcanic field, Colorado; 29 Ma;  of Masonic Park Tuff.
Around White Rock caldera (size: 50 km North-South), White Rock Mountains, Great Basin, Nevada; 29.02 Ma ±0.04;  of Lund Tuff.
Ute Creek (size: 8 km wide), San Juan volcanic field, Colorado; 29 Ma;  of Ute Ridge Tuff.
Platoro calderas (size: 12 x 18 km), San Juan volcanic field, Platoro, Conejos County, Colorado; 29.5 Ma;  of Black Mountain Tuff.
Platoro calderas (size: 18 x 22 km), San Juan volcanic field, Platoro, Conejos County, Colorado; 30 Ma;  of La Jara Canyon Tuff.
Goodsight-Cedar Hills volcano-tectonic depression (Bell Top Formation), south-central New Mexico; 30.5 Ma ±1.5,  of tephra (Bell Top Formation).
William's Ridge, Central Nevada; 31.4 Ma;  of Windous Butte Tuff.
North Pass Caldera, Cochetopa Hills, Central Colorado volcanic field; 32.25 Ma;  of Saguache Creek Tuff.
Organ Caldera (size: 16 km wide), Organ Mountains, New Mexico; 32 Ma,  of Cueva Soledad Rhyolite.
Chinati Caldera (size: 30 x 20 km), Chinati Mountains, Texas; 32.5 Ma ±0.5,  of Mitchel Mesa Rhyolite.
Cowboy Rim (size: 26 x 18 km), Animas Mountains, Hidalgo County, New Mexico; 33 Ma,  of Gillespie Tuff.
Emory Caldera (size: 25 x 55 km), Mogollon-Datil volcanic field, City of Rocks State Park; 33 Ma; VEI 8;   of Kneeling Nun Tuff.
Socorro Caldera (size: 25 x 35 km), Rio Grande rift, Socorro, New Mexico; 33 Ma,  of Hells Mesa Rhyolite.
Mount Aetna (size: 10 km wide), Central Colorado volcanic field; Colorado; 33.81 Ma,  of Badger Creek Tuff.
Grizzly Peak Caldera (size: 12 km wide), Central Colorado volcanic field; Colorado; 34.31 Ma;  of Grizzly Peak Rhyolite.
Juniper Caldera (size: 25 km), Animas Mountains, Hidalgo County, New Mexico; 35 Ma;  of Oak Creek Tuff.
Davis Mountains, Texas; 35.35 Ma ±0.6;  of tuffs of Wild Cherry, Lavas of Casket Mountain.
Davis Mountains, Texas; 35.61 Ma ±0.09;  of Barrel Springs Formation and ash flow tuff.
Quitman Caldera (size: 15 x 10 km), Quitman Mountains, Hudspeth County, Texas; 36 Ma;  of Square Peak Volcanics.
Davis Mountains, Texas; 36.2 Ma ±0.6;  of Mafic lavas.
Davis Mountains, Texas; 36.33 Ma ±0.13;  of tephra (Paisano Volcano).
Davis Mountains, Texas; 36.51 Ma ±0.05;  of Adobe Canyon and Limpia Formations.
Davis Mountains (fissures), Texas; 36.82 Ma ±0.08;  of Flood rhyolites, rhyolite domes, and Gomez Tuff.
Muir Caldera (size: 26 x 18 km wide), Hidalgo County, New Mexico; 37 Ma;  of Woodhaul Canyon tephra.
Infernito Caldera (size: 12 km wide), Trans-Pecos, Texas; 37.5 Ma ±0.5;   of Buckshot Tuff.
Thomas Caldera (size: 16 x 25 km wide), Delta, Utah; 39 Ma;  of Mount Laird Tuff.
Twin Peaks Caldera (size: 20 km), Challis volcanic field, Custer, Idaho; 45 Ma,  of Challis Creek Tuff.
Van Horn cauldron complex (size: 34 x 48 km), Challis volcanic field, Custer, Idaho; 46 Ma ±0.6; unknown amount of Elis Creek Tuff.
Silver Bell Caldera (size: 8 km wide), Arizona; 55.8 Ma; unknown amount of Mount Laird Tuff.
Silver Bell Caldera (size: 8 km wide), Arizona; 68 Ma;  of Lithic Tuff.
Tucson Mountain Caldera (size: 25 km wide), Tucson Mountains, Arizona; 73 Ma;  of Cat Mountain Tuff.

References

Sources

Columbia River Basalt Province-sources

Web citations:

Peter W. Lipman – sources

Maps
Overview map at Basin and Range Province.
Map of the Basin and Range Province
Map: Thelin and Pike (1991), Landforms of the conterminous United States – A digital shaded-relief portrayal, USGS Map I-2206
Global Positioning System (GPS) Time Series
Great Basin/Nevada

 
 Supplemental material: Columbia River Basalt Group,   eruptive loci
Great Basin/Utah

Colorado

New Mexico

Mogollon-Datil volcanic field
 citing from 

Basin and Range Province
Volcanism
Basin and Range Province
Calderas of the United States
Volcanic fields of the western United States
Cenozoic volcanism
Prehistoric volcanic events
VEI-8 eruptions
VEI-7 eruptions
Volcanic eruptions in the United States